Donald Paul Lan Sr. (December 19, 1930 – April 29, 2019) was an American Democratic Party politician who served as Secretary of State of New Jersey from 1977 to 1982. He was appointed to the post by Governor Brendan Byrne. Lan has been the Union County Democratic Chairman.

Background
Lan was born in Newark, New Jersey and was raised in Maplewood, New Jersey. He graduated from Columbia High School and went to Seton Hall University. Lan served in the New Jersey Air National Guard and the United States Army. Lan worked at his family's food processing company: Dell Products in Hillside, New Jersey. Lan died on April 29, 2019 at the age of 88. Lan is survived through his 3 children (Don Jr., Richard, and Barbara), 10 grandchildren, and 9 great-grandchildren.

Political career
A resident of Springfield Township (Union), Lan sought the Democratic nomination for governor in 1981 to succeed a term-limited Brendan Byrne, dropping out of the race in April 1981.

References

1930 births
2019 deaths
People from Maplewood, New Jersey
Politicians from Newark, New Jersey
New Jersey National Guard personnel
Seton Hall University alumni
Businesspeople from New Jersey
New Jersey Democrats
People from Springfield Township, Union County, New Jersey
Secretaries of State of New Jersey
20th-century American businesspeople
20th-century American politicians